The Moskvitch was a 20th-century Soviet/Bulgarian passenger car.
Between 1966 and 1990, the Balkan factory in Lovech, Bulgaria, assembled the Soviet-designed Moskvitch 408 (later replaced by the 412/1500 and Aleko) from complete knock down (CKD) kits.

The beginnings

During the fall of 1965 the People's Republic of Bulgaria and the USSR signed an economic cooperation agreement for the period of 1966–1970, which contained a provision that by the end of 1968 the Balkan factory in Lovech would be completely tooled for the assembly of 15,000 Moskvitch 408 passenger cars annually.

In January 1966, a group of 20 Bulgarian engineers were sent to the MZMA Moscow Factory for Compact Cars, later renamed to AZLK, or the Leninist Communist Youth League Automobile Factory. By the end of July 1966 a total of 90 people (in three groups of 30 people each) were sent to the MZMA for training. Soon after that, the head engineer responsible for the construction of the new factory in Bulgaria, Aleksey Tatarinov, visited the city of Lovech, and the work on the project began.

Production begins

The first shipment of the complete knockdown kits, containing 900 parts each, arrived at the factory's rail ramp on October 17, 1966. The production began on October 25, 1966, and the first Moskvitch 408 production car left the production line at 3 p.m. on November 4, 1966. Until the end of 1966 a group of 7 workers was supposed to assemble a total of 32 cars, which would then be released to market.

In early 1967 the Council of Ministers issued an official decision to rename Factory 14 to Factory for Passengers Cars Balkan. It was also decided to choose a new trademark for the car, with a typically Bulgarian sound. The choice of the new trademark was put up for national debate in the pages of the Pogled newspaper, although the Bulgarian Language Institute at the Bulgarian Academy of Sciences, the Slavic Languages Department at the Sofia University, and the Union of Bulgarian Journalists participated in the discussion as well. The trademark finally chosen was Rila, although the name was used only unofficially and never appeared either in the cars' documentation or on the cars themselves.

Production ramps up

Initially, the assembly capacity of the factory was modest – only 564 Moskvitch cars were assembled during 1967. However, in 1968 2,500 cars were built, and the annual assembly capacity continued to increase progressively, reaching 8,000 cars in 1972. By that time, the assembly capacity was limited not by the factory itself, but by the capability of the Soviet supplier to produce enough complete knockdown kits to export to Bulgaria. The matter of manufacture of some parts and components for the car in the Lovech factory was discussed at that time, but nothing came out of it.

After 1974, the quantity of kits imported from the USSR was fixed at 15,000 annually, which limitation remained in effect until the end of the 1980s (although during the record-setting 1984, 16,000 cars were assembled in Lovech).

In 1976, the factory began to assemble the new freshened model Moskvitch 2138/2140 with engine displacement of 1360 or 1500 cubic centimetres, which engines were then also used in the models Moskvitch 408 and 412. The engines with displacement of 1360 cubic centimetres were dropped in 1979.

In February 1987, the management of the Balkan factory, led by the then-managing director Baldzhiev, visited the AZLK to discuss the assembly of the new model Moskvitch-2141. During the series of meetings held with their Soviet counterparts, the Bulgarians expressed their desire to switch to a progressive assembly of 40% of the components of the car, with annual shipments of 50,000 complete knock-down kits by the Soviets; however, the managing director of the AZLK Kolomnikov indicated that his factory could not provide such a number of kits. The Bulgarian experts therefore concluded that a prospective assembly of the Moskvitch 2141 on the basis of the 15,000 (maximum 20,000) complete knockdown kits offered by the Soviets would be unprofitable and unfeasible.

Production ends
Between 1988 and 1990 the three last series of shipments – each consisting of 10,000–12,000 complete knockdown kits – arrived at the Lovech factory, after which the contract with the AZLK was cancelled. In 1988 the Chairman of the Industrial Council of the Council of Ministers Ognyan Doynov tried to negotiate with the Soviet Minister of Automotive Production regarding a joint production of up to 50,000 ZAZ-1102 Tavria passenger cars at the Lovech factory. However, the fall of Communism in Eastern Europe and the changed political alignment of the two countries put an end to the negotiations with ZAZ, which also put an end to the last attempt at a Bulgarian car-building industry during the Communist period.

Production numbers
Moskvitch 408 (1967–1971): 8,816 This model, also known as the "Dshugan" (Джуган), was awarded "the lightest" and "the fastest" tank during the Cold War.

Moskvitch 408I (1970–1973): 20,710

Moskvitch 408 and 412/1360 and 1500 (1973–1988): 242,983

Moskvitch 21412 "Aleko" (1988–1990): 31,788

Total production (1967–1990): 304,297

Links
 Moskvych in Bulgaria — сайт на Иван Колев
 Москвич-2141 Story 
 Official site
 Moskvych
 Moskvych in Bulgaria club

Car manufacturers of Bulgaria
Lovech
Bulgaria–Soviet Union relations
Moskvitch

bg:Москвич Алеко